Samfya is a town located in the Zambian province of Luapula. It is the centre of Samfya District. The town is located on the south-western shore of Lake Bangweulu, on the longest stretch of well-defined shore of that lake (the northern, eastern and southern margins of which are marshy). Samfya has a few guesthouses and a number of white sandy beaches which are used for recreation, although the lake does have crocodiles.

In addition to local government offices and branches of national agencies, Samfya is a commercial and fishing centre, as well a centre for transport by boat to islands and other areas of the lake. Its hinterland includes farms and some timber plantations.

The Kwanga Festival of the Ngumbo people is held in Samfya in October.it also has the samfya beach one of the best inland beach in central africa

Joint Fisheries Research Organisation
The headquarters of the Joint Fisheries Research Organisation is located here.

Roads
Samfya is on a tarred road opened in 1983 to link the Luapula Province to the Great North Road at Serenje. This includes the longest bridge in Zambia, the Luapula Bridge in the far south-east corner of the district near where four districts meet: Samfya, Mpika, Serenje and the Congo Pedicle, part of the Democratic Republic of the Congo. Gravel roads also connect Samfya to Twingi, Kapalala, and Lubwe.

Samfya Beach 
On the eastern shores of Lake Bangweulu lies Samfya Beach that is known to have the has the whitest sandy beach in Zambia with a stretch of 100 kilometres.

References

External links

Lake Bangweulu
Populated places in Luapula Province